Prairie South School Division #210 (effective January 1, 2006, due to provincial amalgamations) comprises 40 schools in the west-central part of Saskatchewan. This division has an enrollment of about 6800 students.

Prairie South School Division is composed of the former Moose Jaw Public School Division, Thunder Creek School Division, Borderland School Division, Golden Plains School Division, Red Coat Trails, and portions of Davidson School Division and Herbert School Division.

In May 2010, the division announced that Jeff Finell would become director of education when the original director, Brenda Edwards, retired in August 2010.

Director of Education: Jeff Finell

Superintendents
Bernie Girardin
Lori Meyer
Ryan Boughen
Barb Compton
Derrick Huschi
Kim Novak

Schools

References

External links
 Prairie South School Division
 Prairie South School Division Schools

School divisions in Saskatchewan